The men's decathlon event at the 2002 Commonwealth Games was held on 27–28 July.

Medalists

Results

100 metres

Long jump

Shot put

High jump

400 metres

110 metres hurdles

Discus throw

Pole vault

Javelin throw

1500 metres

Final standings

References
Official results
Results at BBC

Decathlon
2002